Benjamin "Ben" Polak (born 22 December 1961) is a British professor of economics and management and former Provost at Yale University. From 1999-2001 Polak was the Henry Kohn Associate Professor of Economics and is now the inaugural William C. Brainard Professor of Economics. In January 2013, he became the Provost of Yale University.

Polak specialises in microeconomic theory, has published 19 peer reviewed papers in leading journals, and is Associate editor of the Journal of Economic Theory.

In 2021 it was reported that Polak was responsible for Yale's decision to terminate the Yale Boswell Editions project, founded in 1949.

Courses taught

In fall 2007, Polak participated in the Open Yale Courses initiative, recording the 24 lecture series and making all course materials freely available on the Internet. Polak describes the motivation for his participation in the scheme as delivering an Ivy League standard education to a wider audience, "It’s not the full Yale experience, unfortunately, but it’s something.”

References

External links
Game Theory course by Benjamin Polak with video lectures, at Open Yale Courses

1961 births
People educated at Bedales School
Alumni of Trinity College, Cambridge
British economists
Northwestern University alumni
Harvard University alumni
Living people
Microeconomists
Yale School of Management faculty